The Defence Force Discipline Act 1982 (Cth) is an Act of the Parliament of Australia, that set the foundation of modern military law in Australia. It governs the Australian Defence Force in its discipline of defence members, powers of service police, rights of defence members, punishment and the Jurisdiction of the Act in regard to State, Territory and Commonwealth law. Section 114, added to the Act in 2007, created

Background

The Act

Amendments 
The Defence Legislation Amendment Act 2007 amended the Act to create the Australian Military Court, which was later deemed constitutionally invalid.

Legacy

References

External links
 Defence Force Discipline Act 1982

Acts of the Parliament of Australia
Australian military law
1982 in Australian law
Military discipline
Military law